William Joseph LeCaine (March 11, 1938 – April 16, 2019) was an Indigenous ice hockey left winger, born on a reservation in Saskatchewan. He played 4 games for the Pittsburgh Penguins of the National Hockey League.

Career statistics

Regular season and playoffs

References

External links
 

1938 births
2019 deaths
Amarillo Wranglers players
Baltimore Clippers players
Canadian ice hockey left wingers
Ice hockey people from Saskatchewan
Indianapolis Chiefs players
Minneapolis Millers (IHL) players
Pittsburgh Penguins players
Port Huron Flags (IHL) players
Port Huron Wings players
Portland Buckaroos players
Regina Pats players
Sportspeople from Moose Jaw
First Nations sportspeople